Navo is an unincorporated community in east central Denton County, Texas, United States, located along U.S. Highway 380 about 10 miles east of Denton, Texas.

History

According to the Handbook of Texas, Navo began in 1847 by Thomas Navo, its namesake. A post office existed from 1884–1907, and Navo had a population of 36 from the mid-1930s through the late 1980s. For many years the town had a grocery store and gas station, which has been used for several businesses off-and-on since. The population was 35 in 2000, though a few nearby subdivided communities of Denton have sprung up as the area between Denton and McKinney, Texas continues to grow in population. The community of Paloma Creek sits on what used to be considered Navo (which technically no longer exists). The Town of Little Elm, Texas has also annexed much of the local property not already included in Denton County Fresh Water Supply Districts.
Navo Fire Station and Navo Road continue to carry the name of the former community.

Education
The Denton Independent School District serves area students. Nearby Navo Middle School is named for the small farming community.

References

Unincorporated communities in Texas
Unincorporated communities in Denton County, Texas
Dallas–Fort Worth metroplex
Populated places established in 1847
1847 establishments in Texas